The Hotel Inspector is an observational documentary television series which is broadcast on the British terrestrial television station, Channel 5, and by other networks around the world. Since 2008, each episode sees celebrated hotelier and businesswoman Alex Polizzi visit a struggling British hotel and try to turn its fortunes by giving advice and suggestions to the owner. Between 2005 and 2008, Ruth Watson was featured in this role.

Series overview

Series 1 (2005)
Series 1 premiered on 29 September 2005 on Channel 5.

Series 2 (2006)
Series 2 premiered on 6 July 2006 at 9 pm on Channel 5.

Series 3 (2007)
Series 3 premiered on 6 September 2007 at 9 pm on Channel 5, with new spin-off series, The Hotel Inspector: Unseen following on Five Life at 10 pm.

The Hotel Inspector: Revisited (2008)
This mini-series premiered on 21 May 2008 at 9 pm on Channel 5. The series consisted entirely of revisits to hotels featured in the previous three series.

Series 4 (2008)
Series 4 premiered on 10 July 2008 at 9 pm on Five, with the spin-off series, The Hotel Inspector Unseen following on Fiver at 10 pm. Series 4 saw Alex Polizzi replace Ruth Watson as The Hotel Inspector.

Series 5 (2009)
Series 5 premiered on 6 July 2009 at 9 pm on Five, starring Alex Polizzi as The Hotel Inspector. The inspection of Hotel du Repos in Switzerland in the final episode was the first international inspection and campaign carried out by the programme.

Series 6 (2010)
This series began on 22 July 2010 at 9 pm on Five. Alex Polizzi returned as the show's host.

Series 7 (2011)
Series 7 started on 18 April 2011 on Channel 5. This was believed to be Polizzi's final series, according to a tweet she made on her official Twitter page, thus putting the future of the show in jeopardy. However, it was revealed in September 2011, that The Hotel Inspector would return on 3 October 2011.

The same graphics had been used as in previous series but a reworked new theme tune was adopted. This was the first time in the show history that the theme tune was altered. The show also had a competition advertised during the show breaks. Prizes included trips to the Maldives, a Holiday in a castle in Ireland & a luxury break in Mauritius.

In the table below the viewing figures have been supplied via BARB.

Series 8 (2011)
Series 8 started on 3 October 2011 on Channel 5. Alex Polizzi returned with the new series. The same graphics and theme tune adopted for series 7 remained for this series. The viewer competition remained with holidays for spa breaks in the New Forest being just one of the competition prizes.

The opening episode opened with just over 1 million viewers, lower than the opening episode of the previous series.

In the table below the viewing figures have been supplied via BARB.

Series 9 (2012)
A ninth series, with Alex Polizzi returning, was ordered and comprised ten episodes including two revisits which aired from 5 July 2012 at 9pm.

The Hotel Inspector Returns (2013)
A series consisting of four episodes returning to previous locations was announced in June 2013 and started airing 18 July 2013 on channel 5.

Series 10 (2014)
A tenth series, again with Alex Polizzi, was confirmed in July 2013 and began airing on 6 February 2014 on Channel 5 at 9pm.

The Hotel Inspector Returns (2014)
A series consisting of four episodes returning to previous locations commenced on 26 June 2014. Viewing figures are from BARB and include Channel 5+1.

Series 11 (2015)
The eleventh series of The Hotel Inspector started airing 9 April 2015 on Channel 5. The viewing figures in the table below are supplied via BARB, they include Channel 5+1.

The Hotel Inspector Returns (2015)
A series consisting of four episodes returning to previous locations commenced on 1 September 2015. Viewing figures are from BARB and include Channel 5+1.

Series 12 (2016)
The twelfth series of The Hotel Inspector started airing 1 June 2016 on Channel 5. The viewing figures in the table below are the Channel 5 total weekly viewers supplied via BARB.

The Hotel Inspector Returns (2016)
A series consisting of three episodes returning to previous locations commenced on 30 August 2016. Viewing figures are from BARB and include Channel 5+1.

Series 13 (2017)

The thirteenth series of The Hotel Inspector aired on the 27 June 2017 at 9.00pm on Channel 5. Viewing figures are from BARB and include Channel 5+1.

Hotel Inspector: Checking in, Checking Out (2017)
A series consisting of four episodes returning to previous locations commenced on 8 September 2017. Noticeably within the episodes produced, normal 'The Hotel Inspector Returns' title cards were used, not the 'Checking In, Checking Out' title as used in programme listings. Viewing figures are from BARB and include Channel 5+1. There was a small hiatus within the series, with the last two episodes being shown at 3am and 4am on 17 December respectively.

Series 14 (2018)

The fourteenth series of The Hotel Inspector aired on 5 June 2018 at 9.00pm on Channel 5.

Series 15 (2019)

The fifteenth series of The Hotel Inspector began airing on 6 June 2019 at 9.00pm on Channel 5. The episode aired on 13 June was originally scheduled to be ‘The New Lawndes Arms, Milton Keynes’ and it is unknown whether this was rescheduled.

Series 16 (2021)

The sixteenth series of The Hotel Inspector began airing on 10 June 2021 at 9.00pm on Channel 5.

Series 17 (2022)

The seventh series of The Hotel Inspector began airing on 16 June 2022 at 9.00pm on Channel 5.

References

External links
The Hotel Inspector at channel5.com
The Hotel Inspector: Revisited at channel5.com
 

Hotel
Hotel
Lists of British non-fiction television series episodes